Sinnathamby Rajaratnam  (25 February 1915 – 22 February 2006), better known as S. Rajaratnam, was a Singaporean politician who served as Deputy Prime Minister of Singapore between 1980 and 1985. Rajaratnam is widely recognized as one of the founding fathers of Singapore. He was also one of the founders of the People's Action Party (PAP), which has governed the country continuously since independence.

Rajaratnam was one of the pioneering leaders of independent Singapore as it achieved self-governance in 1959 and later independence in 1965. He devoted much of his adult life to public service, and helped shape the mentality of Singaporeans on contemporary issues. 

The S. Rajaratnam School of International Studies at the Nanyang Technological University and the S. Rajaratnam block of Raffles Institution are named after him.

Early life and education
The second child of Sabapathy Pillai Sinnathamby and his wife N. Annamah, both of Jaffna Tamil descent, Rajaratnam was born in Vaddukoddai, Jaffna, Sri Lanka. His father had wanted him to be born there for auspicious reasons after the premature death of his older brother. He was then brought back to Malaya and raised in Seremban and Selangor. His younger brother, S. Seevaratnam, was born in Seremban and was a founding member of the Democratic Action Party.

Rajaratnam attended St. Paul's Institution, Victoria Institution in Kuala Lumpur, and Raffles Institution in Singapore before going on to King's College London in 1937 to pursue a law degree. However, he was unable to receive funding from his family to continue his studies due to the Second World War; instead, he turned to journalism to earn a living. 

He met his wife Piroska Feher, a Hungarian teacher, while in London. In London, Rajaratnam also wrote a series of short stories which The Spectator'''s J.B. Trend reviewed positively. Rajaratnam also gained the attention of George Orwell, who then worked in the Indian Section of the BBC’s Eastern Service based in London and recruited Rajaratnam to contribute scripts for the network. Rajaratnam's short stories and radio plays were later published by Epigram Books in The Short Stories & Radio Plays of S. Rajaratnam (2011).

Rajaratnam returned to Singapore in 1948 when he joined the Malayan Tribune and stopped writing short stories. In 1950, he joined Singapore Tiger Standard that was founded by Aw Boon Haw. In 1954, he joined The Straits Times as a journalist. He was bold in writing about the way Singapore was governed by the British. This incurred the displeasure of the colonial government. His column, "I write as I please", attracted so much attention that he was called for questioning by the government.

Political career
In 1954, Rajaratnam co-founded the People's Action Party (PAP) together with Lee Kuan Yew, Toh Chin Chye, Goh Keng Swee and others. He became popular among his supporters for being able to effectively follow the "mood of the people". He thought of a multiracial Singapore and envisioned her to be a "global city". He was also actively involved in organising major political campaigns against far-left political groups in Singapore. 

Rajaratnam had served in the Cabinet as Minister for Culture in 1959, Minister for Foreign Affairs between 1965 and 1980, Minister for Labour between 1968 and 1971, Deputy Prime Minister between 1980 and 1985, and Senior Minister between 1985 and 1988. Rajaratnam is remembered for authoring the Singapore National Pledge in 1966.

Rajaratnam was Singapore's first Foreign Minister, following its abrupt independence in 1965. During his tenure as Minister for Foreign Affairs, Rajaratnam helped Singapore gain entry into the United Nations and later the Non-Aligned Movement in 1970. He built up the Ministry of Foreign Affairs and helped to establish diplomatic relations with other countries and secure international recognition of Singapore's sovereignty. He carried out the foreign policy of international self-assertion to establish Singapore's independence during the period when the country faced significant challenges including the Konfrontasi conflict in the 1960s and the withdrawal of British troops in the early 1970s. Rajaratnam was one of the five "founding fathers" of the Association of Southeast Asian Nations (ASEAN) in 1967. In this diplomatic arena together with the United Nations, he helped to draw international attention to the Vietnamese invasion of Cambodia in 1978. Sompong Sucharitkul, an aide of Thailand's then foreign minister Thanat Khoman, conveys Rajaratnam's stance on ASEAN membership for Sri Lanka in 1967:

"I remember one was an economics minister. He waited there anxiously for a signal to join the discussion; but it never came. It was Rajaratnam of Singapore who opposed the inclusion of Sri Lanka. He argued the country's domestic situation was unstable and there would be trouble. Not good for a new organisation."

During his tenure as Minister for Labour, Rajaratnam implemented tough labour laws to attempt to restore stability in the Singapore's economy and attracted multinational corporations to invest in Singapore. 

Throughout his political career, Rajaratnam had played a key role in the pragmatic and technocratic PAP government that radically improved Singapore's economic situation, alongside huge developments in social development on the island with massive expansion of healthcare programmes, pensions, public housing and maintaining an extremely low unemployment rate. This is well underlined by his following statement:

"We believe in a democratic society by governments freely and periodically elected by the people... We believe, in the virtue of hard work and that those who work harder in society should be given greater rewards... We believe that the world does not owe us a living and that we have to earn our keep."

Nonetheless, Rajaratnam did not believe in the need for a strong opposition in Parliament, which he considered "non-communist subversion"; he was unapologetic about the dominant party system in Singapore saying:

"Given a one-party government, the capacity of such a government to act far more independently than if it were harassed by an opposition and by proxies, is obvious. In the game of competitive interference pawns which can behave like bishops and castles and knights can in certain circumstances be extremely inconvenient and very irritating."

Rajaratnam was a strong believer in multiracialism in Singapore, and when drafting the Singapore National Pledge in 1966 just two years after the 1964 racial riots, he wrote the words "One united people, regardless of race, language or religion." In the 1980s and 1990s, when the government began implementing several policies to promote the use of "mother tongue" languages and ethnic-based self-help groups such as Chinese Development Assistance Council (CDAC) and Yayasan Mendaki, Rajaratnam expressed his opposition to these policies which, in his view, ran counter to the vision of establishing a common Singapore identity where "when race, religion, language does not matter". He advocated for greater racial integration which he felt was still lacking in the country.

Rajaratnam also disagreed with Prime Minister Lee Kuan Yew on the policy of giving incentives to women who are college graduates and have more children, as he felt that the policy was unfair. Despite their differences in opinion on certain issues, Rajaratnam was loyal to Lee and remained as a member of the "core team" of Lee's government which included Goh Keng Swee, Hon Sui Sen and Lim Kim San, and they dominated Singapore's political scene from 1959 to the mid-1980s.

Personal life
Rajaratnam first met his Hungarian wife, Piroska Feher, while studying in London and quietly married in 1943. Feher's grandmother was a member of the wealthy Csáky clan who had lost their fortune due to the dissolution of the Austro-Hungarian Empire after the First World War. Piroska, disgruntled by the rise of Nazism, moved to the United Kingdom where she worked as an au pair and teacher and eventually met Rajaratnam. Former Member of the European Parliament Gyula Hegyi is her nephew.

The couple moved to Malaya at the conclusion of the Second World War but Rajaratnam's parents disapproved of their new daughter-in-law, even telling her that they would not accept "half-caste" descendants. They did not have any children and remained married until her death in 1989 from pulmonary pneumonia at the age of 76.

After Rajaratnam retired from politics in 1988 as part of the leadership transition, he served at the Institute of Southeast Asian Studies as Distinguished Senior Fellow from between 1989 and 1997.

In 1994, Rajaratnam was diagnosed with dementia and was unable to move or talk by 2001. He was assisted by six maids, including his long-time maid of 21 years, Cecelia Tandoc.

Death and legacy

Rajaratnam died on 22 February 2006 of heart failure at his residence at Chancery Lane in Bukit Timah. As a mark of respect, Mediacorp Channel 5 and Channel 8 observed a minute of silence that night. State flags at all Government buildings were flown at half-mast from 23 to 25 February 2006.

Rajaratnam's body rested at his home in 30 Chancery Lane from 22 to 23 February. Some of his former colleagues, Toh Chin Chye, S. Dhanabalan, Othman Wok, Lee Hsien Loong, S. R. Nathan and Tharman Shanmugaratnam, paid their last respects at his home. His body lay in state at Parliament House from 9:30am to 9:00pm on 24 February 2006.

In recognition of his contributions as one of the nation's founding fathers, Rajaratnam was accorded a state funeral at the Esplanade – Theatres on the Bay on 25 February 2006. The coffin was carried from Parliament House to the Esplanade at 1:30pm on a ceremonial gun carriage, past the historic Civic District. The service was attended by President S. R. Nathan, Cabinet ministers, Members of Parliament and other invited guests.

During the funeral, Prime Minister Lee Hsien Loong, Minister Mentor Lee Kuan Yew, diplomat Tommy Koh and orthopaedic surgeon V. K. Pillay delivered their eulogies; Lee Kuan Yew cried while delivering his eulogy. The state flag and the Order of Temasek conferred to Rajaratnam, draped on the coffin were given to President S. R. Nathan and later to S. Vijayaratnam and S. Jothiratnam, Rajaratnam's nephews and closest relatives. The Singapore National Pledge was recited by the mourners.

Rajaratnam's state funeral was broadcast live on Channel NewsAsia. The programme, called "Farewell to S. Rajaratnam", aired from 1:30 to 3:15 pm on 25 February 2006. His body was cremated at 5:00 pm at Mandai Crematorium.

Organisations with which Rajaratnam was associated in life published obituaries in The Straits Times; these included the Institute of Southeast Asian Studies, Ceylon Sports Club, Singapore Ceylon Tamils' Association, Singapore Indian Fine Arts Society, Nanyang Technological University, Old Rafflesians' Association, Raffles Institution, Raffles Junior College and Raffles Girls' School. The Institute of Southeast Asian Studies noted: In the words he himself chose, 
Namesakes
The Institute for Defence and Strategic Studies (IDSS) at the Nanyang Technological University was renamed S. Rajaratnam School of International Studies in recognition of Rajaratnam's contributions to Singapore's foreign and diplomatic policy.

In memory of Rajaratnam, the then-unnamed newly constructed seven-storey building in Raffles Institution, his alma mater, was christened as the S. Rajaratnam Block.

Launched on 21 October 2014, the S$100-million S. Rajaratnam Endowment was set up by Temasek Holdings to support programmes that foster international and regional cooperation. Its chairman, Wong Kan Seng, said that the values that Rajaratnam stood for as Singapore's first Foreign Minister are even more relevant today.

Film appearances
Rajaratnam is a central character in Two Meetings and a Funeral'', a film about the Nonaligned Movement by Naeem Mohaiemen. Rajaratnam's call for developing economies to become technology sufficient, rather than depending on the technology of the west is featured in the film.

References

Bibliography

External links 
 S. Rajaratnam Professorship
 S.Rajaratnam – One Hundred Tamils of 20th Century

1915 births
Singaporean people of Indian descent
2006 deaths
Alumni of King's College London
Raffles Institution alumni
Deputy Prime Ministers of Singapore
Sri Lankan emigrants to Singapore
People's Action Party politicians
Singaporean people of Sri Lankan Tamil descent
Sri Lankan Tamil politicians
Singaporean agnostics
Singaporean Hindus
Members of the Parliament of Singapore
Members of the Legislative Assembly of Singapore
Singaporean writers
Singaporean journalists
Members of the Dewan Rakyat
Ministers for Foreign Affairs of Singapore
Recipients of the Darjah Utama Temasek
Ministers for Labour of Singapore
20th-century journalists
Grand Collars of the Order of Lakandula